The 2013–14 PGA Tour is the 99th season of the PGA Tour, and the 47th since separating from the PGA of America. The season, which began on October 10, 2013, is the first to span two calendar years, with an October–September format.

Schedule
The following table lists official events during the 2013–14 season.

Unofficial events
The following events were sanctioned by the PGA Tour, but did not carry FedEx Cup points or official money, nor were wins official.

Location of tournaments

Money leaders
The money list was based on prize money won during the season, calculated in U.S. dollars.

Awards

See also
2014 European Tour

Notes

References

External links
Official Site
2014 PGA Tour at ESPN

PGA Tour seasons
PGA Tour
PGA Tour